The Best Yet is the first "greatest hits" album from alternative rock band Switchfoot, released on November 4, 2008.

Columbia Records, the band's former record label, was the mastermind behind releasing the record, with heavy input concerning the track list coming directly from the band itself. "We want to make sure if it's got our name on it (that) it's a product we like," lead singer Jon Foreman explained. "So we're trying to steer (Columbia) in the right direction." A tentative track listing was announced August 20, 2008, but the official track listing was later announced on the band's official message boards by Switchfoot bassist Tim Foreman.
Last Record in general by Switchfoot released on a major label.

In its first week, The Best Yet sold 4,500 copies, marking it #123 on the Billboard 200 overall chart.

A live DVD titled "The Best Yet: Live in Nashville" was released later.

Track listing

CD

Deluxe Edition Bonus DVD Videos 
There is also a Deluxe Edition of "The Best Yet" that was released simultaneously and features music videos from throughout the band's career. It also features audio commentaries spaced throughout, with the band members talking about the songs chosen and the music videos chosen.

Track listing 
 "Dare You to Move"
 "Meant to Live"
 "Stars"
 "Oh! Gravity"
 "Awakening"
 "We Are One Tonight"
 "The Blues"
 "Chem 6A"
 "Company Car"
 "New Way to be Human"
 "You Already Take Me There"
 "Happy is a Yuppie Word"
 "Meant to Live" (Original)
 "Dare You to Move" (Alternate)

Tour Edition 
This version is currently available during the band's shows.  It features fewer tracks than the normal edition, but is significantly cheaper.  Also, it comes in a Discbox Slider instead of a jewel case.

 "Dare You to Move"
 "Meant to Live"
 "This is Your Life"
 "Oh! Gravity"
 "This is Home"
 "Learning to Breathe"
 "Stars"
 "On Fire"
 "Only Hope"
 "Awakening"
 "The Beautiful Letdown"

Special Edition 

Disc One:
 "Dare You to Move"
 "We Are One Tonight"
 "The Blues"
 "Chem 6A"
 "Meant to Live"
 "New Way to be Human"
 "You Already Take Me There"
 "Happy is a Yuppie Word"
 "Stars"
 "Oh! Gravity"
 "This Is Home"
 "Learning To Breathe"

Disc Two:
 "Awakening"
 "This Is Your Life"
 "On Fire"
 "Only Hope"
 "Dirty Second Hands"
 "Love Is the Movement"
 "Company Car"
 "Lonely Nation"
 "The Shadow Proves the Sunshine"
 "Concrete Girl"
 "Twenty-Four"
 "The Beautiful Letdown"

Charts

References 

Switchfoot compilation albums
2008 greatest hits albums
2008 video albums
Music video compilation albums
Columbia Records compilation albums
Columbia Records video albums